Wendover is a city on the western edge of Tooele County, Utah, United States. The population was 1,115 at the 2020 census.

Description
Wendover is on the western border of Utah and is contiguous with West Wendover, Nevada. Interstate 80 runs just north of both cities, while Interstate 80 Business (Wendover Boulevard) runs through the two cities. The Wendover Cut-off was the former path of the Victory Highway as well as U.S. Route 40 to Wendover. Today it serves as a frontage road between Wendover and Knolls just to the south of the Interstate.

History
The town was established in 1908 as a station stop on the Western Pacific Railroad, then under construction.

However, the line was not utilized until January 25, 1915, when the first transcontinental telephone call was made to coincide with the opening of the Panama Pacific Exposition.

From 1917 to 1939, a Western Pacific subsidiary known as the Deep Creek Railroad also operated into Wendover. The Western Pacific became part of the larger Union Pacific Railroad in 1983.

During World War II, the nearby Wendover Army Air Field (later known as the Wendover Air Force Base) was a training base for bomber pilots, including the crew of the Enola Gay. The Enola Gay was stationed here until June 1945.

In 2008, the Utah Department of Transportation completed an interchange at Aria Boulevard on Interstate 80. Investment is also underway to restore the Wendover Airport (located at the former Wendover Air Force Base) which is currently managed by Tooele County.

Movements to unite Wendover with West Wendover, which is located across the border in Nevada and allows gambling operations, have taken place but require the approval of the U.S. Congress and the Nevada and Utah legislatures. The U.S. House of Representatives passed a resolution permitting Wendover to leave Utah and join Nevada in 2002, but the bill was stalled in the U.S. Senate and did not become law.

Demographics

As of the census of 2000, there were 1,537 people, 432 households, and 327 families residing in the city. The population density was 238.9 people per square mile (92.3/km2). There were 510 housing units at an average density of 79.3 per square mile (30.6/km2). The racial makeup of the city is 68.64% Hispanic or Latino, 43.98% White, 1.17% African American, 1.76% Native American, 0.85% Asian, 0.13% Pacific Islander, 43.59% from other races, and 8.52% from two or more races.

There were 432 households, out of which 54.9% had children under the age of 18 living with them, 56.9% were married couples living together, 11.6% had a female householder with no husband present, and 24.1% were non-families. Of all households, 16.7% were made up of individuals, and 3.5% had someone living alone who was 65 years of age or older. The average household size was 3.56 and the average family size was 4.10.

In the city, the population was spread out, with 39.9% under the age of 18, 13.0% from 18 to 24, 30.0% from 25 to 44, 13.2% from 45 to 64, and 3.9% who were 65 years of age or older. The median age was 24 years. For every 100 females, there were 106.3 males. For every 100 females age 18 and over, there were 106.7 males.

The median income for a household in the city was $31,196, and the median income for a family was $29,722. Males had a median income of $18,417 versus $20,682 for females. The per capita income for the city was $10,794. About 24.7% of families and 26.1% of the population were below the poverty line, including 29.1% of those under age 18 and 16.1% of those age 65 or over.

Government
Wendover uses a city council with five council members that meet on the first and third Thursday of every month. As of March 2020, the current mayor of Wendover is Mike Crawford.

Geography
According to the United States Census Bureau, the city has a total area of 6.4 square miles (16.7 km2), all land.

The hillside letter W can be seen in the north.

Climate
Wendover and West Wendover have a cool arid climate (Köppen BWk) with hot summers, freezing winters, and substantial diurnal temperature ranges. The cities’ location east of the Ruby Mountains makes them the driest in the Great Basin, averaging only  of precipitation per year, or about half that of nearby Ely or Elko. It affects snowfall even more dramatically: Wendover and West Wendover average only  of snow, one-eighth to one-tenth the snowfall of the two nearby county seats.

Education
Tooele County School District's Anna Smith Elementary School serves the Wendover area.

Circa 1996, when there were talks about moving Wendover into Nevada, some area people were concerned that this would encourage the school district to stop spending funds on proposals for schools in Wendover. At the time Wendover did not have an elementary school and residents wished to have one.

Government
Wendover and Tooele County also operate a joint complex for municipal and county functions.

See also

 List of cities in Utah

References

External links

 
 Historic Wendover Airfield -- Non-profit foundation
 A Visit to Wendover Field 
 

1908 establishments in Utah
Cities in Tooele County, Utah
Cities in Utah
Populated places established in 1908
Salt Lake City metropolitan area